James Edward Barton (November 1, 1890 – February 19, 1962) was an American vaudevillian, stage performer, and a character actor in films and on television.

Biography
He was born into a theatrical family on November 1, 1890 in Gloucester City, New Jersey. Barton began performing in minstrel shows and burlesque houses throughout the country in 1898. His years of experience working with African American performers led to his becoming one of the first jazz dancers in America.

After working with repertory companies in the South and Midwest, he made his Broadway debut in the musical revue The Passing Show of 1919 in a role originally intended for Ed Wynn. He frequently was the highlight in otherwise-mediocre productions, and a critic for the Daily News noted, "Whenever the book failed him, he shuffled into one or more of his eccentric dances." He commonly worked in blackface at the time. Barton's other theatre credits include Sweet and Low in 1930, Tobacco Road in 1933, Bright Lights of 1944 (which ran for only four performances), The Iceman Cometh in 1946, and Paint Your Wagon in 1951.

While appearing on Broadway, Barton also achieved the highest pinnacle of status in vaudeville, headlining at the Palace Theater on Broadway not once but eight times, from March 1928 through April 1932.

Barton's film career was also concurrent to his stage performances. It began in the silent era, in 1923, and he appeared in a number of Paramount Pictures short subjects in 1929.

On television he appeared in The Ford Television Theatre, Lux Video Theatre, Studio One, The Kaiser Aluminum Hour, Playhouse 90, Kraft Television Theatre, The Rifleman, The Americans, Adventures in Paradise, Naked City, and Frontier Circus.

Bing Crosby considered James Barton to be one of his ten favorite performers of all time, alongside names such as Al Jolson, Frank Sinatra, Lena Horne, Louis Armstrong, Judy Garland, and Nat King Cole. Sammy Cahn has stated he considered Barton to be the greatest entertainer ("If there was a decathlon for performing ... James Barton would win, going away."), and cherished the St. Genesius medal he was given by Barton's widow above his Academy Awards.

Barton died of a heart attack at Nassau Hospital in Mineola, New York on February 19, 1962.

Filmography

References

External links

James Barton on Answers.com
James Barton Filmography
James Barton Papers, 1890s-1990s, held by the Billy Rose Theatre Division, New York Public Library for the Performing Arts

1890 births
1962 deaths
American male stage actors
American male film actors
American male dancers
Vaudeville performers
American male television actors
19th-century American male actors
20th-century American male actors
People from Gloucester City, New Jersey
Eccentric dancers
20th-century American dancers